The Ministry of Science, Technology, Innovation and Communications (abbreviated MCTIC) was a cabinet-level federal ministry in Brazil. The last Minister of Communications was Marcos Pontes.  It was dissolved in May 2016.

See also
 Ministry of Science, Technology and Innovation (Brazil)
 Other ministries of Communications

References

External links
 Official site

Government ministries of Brazil
Communications in Brazil